The Samsung Galaxy A8 (2016) (stylized as SAMSUNG Galaxy A86) is an Android phablet produced by Samsung Electronics.  It was introduced on September 30, 2016 by South Korean telecom provider SK Telecom. Unlike most Galaxy A series smartphones, the Galaxy A8 (2016) has a better processor similar to Samsung's 2015 flagships, the Samsung Galaxy S6, Samsung Galaxy S6 Edge and Samsung Galaxy Note 5.

Following its release, the Galaxy A8 (2016) is only available in the South Korean market with a price of 649,000 South Korean won (estimated around 580 USD), as of October 1, 2016. Other countries are expected to release the device soon.

Hardware
The smartphone features an Exynos 7420 SoC consisting of 4 ARM Cortex-A57 and 4 Cortex-A53 backed by the Mali-T760MP8 GPU and sports 3 GB of RAM and 32 GB internal storage, expandable to 256 GB via a MicroSD slot which can also be used for a second Nano-SIM (in international versions). The device retains a non-removable battery like its predecessor, rated at 3500 mAh with Adaptive Fast Charging technology. The Galaxy A8 (2016) also has a fingerprint scanner and support for Samsung Pay with NFC and MST communication technologies.

Design
The Samsung Galaxy A8 (2016) has a full metal body, similar to the previous Samsung Galaxy A8. The Galaxy A8 (2016) has a larger 5.7-inch display compared to the Samsung Galaxy Note 7, but it uses a Full HD Super AMOLED. The Galaxy A8 (2016)’s front display is protected by Corning Gorilla Glass 4.

Software
The Samsung Galaxy A8 (2016) runs Android 6.0.1 Marshmallow with Grace UX interface introduced in the Galaxy Note 7. A new "Always On display" functionality displays a clock, calendar, and notifications on-screen when the device is in standby, similar to Samsung Galaxy S7, S7 Edge.

See also
 Samsung Galaxy A8 (2015)
 Samsung Galaxy A3 (2016)
 Samsung Galaxy A5 (2016)
 Samsung Galaxy A7 (2016)
 Samsung Galaxy A9 (2016)
 Samsung Galaxy A9 Pro (2016)

References

Android (operating system) devices
Mobile phones introduced in 2016
Samsung smartphones
Samsung Galaxy
Discontinued smartphones